Khelo India Youth Games (KIYG), formerly Khelo India School Games (KISG), are the annual national level multidisciplinary grassroot games in India held in January or February for two categories, namely under-17 years school students and under-21 college students.

The Training of Trainers (TOT) Programme was held in December 2018- January 2019 in the first phase. Here total of 160  trainers will be trained in 4 batches of 40 each in December-January period. This TOT Programme will  be carried out semi-annually or quarterly to include all the interested teachers, principals, vice-principals and physical education trainers.

History
On 31 January 2018, Prime Minister, Narendra Modi, inaugurated Khelo India School Games at the opening ceremony based on Guru–shishya tradition held at Indira Gandhi Arena. from the 2019 events, Khelo India School Games were renamed to Khelo India Youth Games after Indian Olympic Association came on board earlier in September 2018. The second edition of the event was kicked off in Shree Shiv Chhatrapati Sports Complex, a sports complex situated in Balewadi, Pune, by Sports Minister, Rajyavardhan Singh Rathore, and, Chief Minister of Maharashtra, Devendra Fadnavis.

On 27 February 2019, PM Narendra Modi launched the Khelo India App at the Youth Indian Parliament in Vigyan Bhawan, New Delhi to promote sports and fitness.

On 22 February 2020, Prime Minister Narendra Modi inaugurated the first edition of the Khelo India University Games in Cuttack to give athletes the exposure of multi-disciplinary events at the university level.

Games and Medals
The inaugural 2018 games had students competing for 209 gold medals across 17 sports.

Badminton, basketball, boxing,, cricket (26 gold medals), gymnastics (20 gold medals), judo (16 gold medals), kabaddi, volleyball and wrestling (30 gold medals) were held at the Indira Gandhi Indoor Stadium Complex. Athletics (36 gold medals), football, kho kho and weightlifting (16 gold medals) were held at the Jawaharlal Nehru Stadium.  Swimming at the Shyama Prasad Mukherjee Swimming Complex (35 gold medals), hockey at the Dhyan Chand National Stadium and shooting at the Dr. Karni Singh Shooting Range were other venues.

In December 2020 four indigenous games were added – Gatka, Kalaripayattu, Thang-Ta and Mallakhamba.

In the 5th edition of Khelo India Youth Games 2 games were added – Kayaking and Canoeing

Execution

Selection criteria
Only selected school kids below the age of 17 years are eligible to compete. In the individual sports, top 8 sportsperson from the School Games Federation of India's National School Games, 4 nominations from federation, one from Central Board of Secondary Education, one from the host State and 2 wild card entries for the individual events will be selected. In team sports, the top 4 from the National School Games, 2 nominations by the federation, 1 from the host State and one from the organising committee will be selected. For archery, badminton and shooting, the top 16 from the National School Games, 8 nominations by the federation, 1 from CBSE, 1 from host State, 1 from organising committee, and 6 from wild cards will be selected.

Talent hunt and scholarship
To identify the talent at grassroot level, each sports has a dedicated talent hunt committee, who will identify top 2 sportsperson for each sports and they will be given an annual scholarship of INR 500,000 for 8 years.

Edition-wise Medal Tally
(T - Total medals won, G - Gold won, S - Silver won, B - Bronze won)

See also
 National Games of India
 Khelo India Winter Games
 Khelo India University Games

References

External links

 Khelo India, official website

Multi-sport events in India

India
2018 establishments in India
Sport in India
Khelo India